This is a list of channels broadcast under the CNBC brand (formerly Consumer News and Business Channel) by NBCUniversal and its affiliates around the world. Following on from the original United States-based channel, launched in 1989, European and Asian versions were established in 1995 and 1996 respectively. Since then, sub-continental and local language versions of the channel have been created in Europe, Asia, Africa, and the Middle East, many under a licensing agreement. At present, sixteen distinct CNBC channels exist worldwide, of which seven are wholly owned by NBCUniversal and a further nine have NBCUniversal as a minority stakeholder or a licensor. A further channel, the Korean language operated SBS-CNBC, began broadcasting on December 28, 2009, in conjunction with Seoul Broadcasting System. Later, the Indonesian Language operated CNBC Indonesia, is launched in 2018 in conjunction with Trans Media.

List of channels

Closed channels
TVN CNBC started in 2007 and closed in 2014, in Poland. CNBC-e started in 2000 and closed in 2015 in Turkey. MBN-CNBC started in 2002 and rechanged mbn in 2005 and relaunched general channel Maeil Broadcasting Network in 2011 in South Korea, CNBC was also cooperated with etomato and Chosun Ilbo (now cooperate with Seoul Broadcasting System). CNBC Pakistan started in 2005 and became Jaag TV in 2013 in Pakistan. SBS CNBC started on December 28, 2009, and closed on December 31, 2020, and became SBS Biz.

Local feeds

The following channels are not independent operational entities, but rather sub-regional services operated by CNBC Europe and Asia. They largely show identical programming to the main pan-regional feed, but operate a localised ticker relevant to that particular area and in some cases air area-specific advertising.

Notes
Those channels in which NBC Universal does not hold a stake are operated under a licensing agreement.
As CFN, later CFN/CNBC.
Original launch date; merged with Dow Jones-owned competitors Asia Business News and European Business News in 1998.
Formerly co-owned with Dow Jones & Company.
As CNBC India.
Also airs some English-language programming from CNBC's international networks.

References

Class CNBC: Class Editori: About Us , Class CNBC home page , 
CNBC: About CNBC U.S.
CNBC Africa: Behind The Scenes At CNBC Africa
CNBC Arabiya: 
CNBC Asia: About CNBC Asia, 
CNBC-e: CNBC-e contact details, "Glocalization" - a Case History: Commercial Partnerships and Cooperation between Turkish and American Satellite Broadcasters
CNBC Europe: About CNBC Europe, 
CNBC Pakistan: About CNBC Pakistan, CNBC Pakistan case study, DMA Media
CNBC World: About CNBC World, 
Nikkei CNBC: 
TVN CNBC Biznes: 

CNBC